Roebourne  is a town in Western Australia's Pilbara region. In the Ngarluma language, Roebourne is called Yirramagardu (Ieramagadu). It is 35 km from Karratha, 202 km from Port Hedland and 1,563 km from Perth, the state's capital. It is located within the City of Karratha. It prospered during its gold boom of the late 19th century and was once the largest settlement between Darwin and Perth.

History

Roebourne is on the traditional lands of the Ngarluma people, who have occupied the area for tens of thousands of years. Many Ngarluma people, alongside other traditional owner populations, continue to live in Roebourne, and continue to practise traditional law, culture and language. Ngarluma and Yindjibarndi people are represented by the Ngarluma and Yindjibarndi Foundation Ltd (NYFL), and their respective prescribed body corporates. Ngarluma people hold native title rights for the Roebourne area.

Roebourne's name honours John Septimus Roe, the first Surveyor General of Western Australia.

The Pilbara region was first explored by Francis Thomas Gregory in 1861. Gregory regarded the area as highly suitable for pastoral settlement. The first settlers, including Gregory's cousin Emma Withnell and her young family, arrived in the Roebourne area in 1863. The Withnells established themselves on the banks of the Harding River 13 km from the coast, where they had access to a reasonable fresh water supply, and took up 30,000 acres (120 km2) at the foot of Mount Welcome. In common with many settlers at the time, they hired local Aboriginal people to work on their properties as shepherds, labourers and shearers.

By 1865, the population of the area had grown to about 200, and the Withnells' property served as a local hub, with John Withnell opening a store and providing cartage services to the other settlers. Prior to the construction of a church in the area, services were held in their home.

The Government Resident, Robert John Sholl (1819–86), arrived in November 1865 from the failed Camden Harbour settlement (near Kuri Bay) to provide assistance in developing the region and set up camp near the Withnells' home while trying to find a suitable townsite. He eventually decided to locate the town at his camp and, on 17 August 1866, after surveyor Charles Wedge drew a draft plan consisting of 106 lots, Roebourne became the first gazetted town in the North West. It became the region's administrative centre and various government buildings, shops, services and hotels set up business. Sholl himself served as Justice of the Peace, district registrar and magistrate, and he was concerned with the plight of the local indigenous people and made submissions to the Government to ensure they had basic rights.

In 1872, the town was destroyed by a cyclone. Many of the buildings from shortly after this time are heritage-listed. A number of the heritage buildings were the work of the eminent Public Works Department architect George Temple-Poole. 

The Old Roebourne Gaol commenced construction in 1896, the stones being quarried and laid by Aboriginal prisoners who were detained there in extremely harsh conditions between 1896 and 1923. It was used again between 1975 and 1984 before the opening of a new Roebourne Regional Prison, which remains controversial as cells can swelter in 50-degree-Celsius temperatures with no air-conditioning.

The site of the Withnells' house, which was rebuilt in 1937 by a later owner, is located on Hampton Street at the foot of Mount Welcome.

Gold from Nullagine, discovered in 1878, and surrounding copper and tin mines contributed to Roebourne's prosperity in the 1880s and 1890s. With the decline of both, Roebourne lost the majority of its European population and became a shadow of its former self. Remnants from that era of prosperity are various National Trust buildings around the town.

The area was struck by another cyclone in 1925 that destroyed the Port Samson jetty and lifted the bridge to Pope's nose from the river bed. Several buildings were also destroyed with the town's residents seeking refuge in public brick buildings during the storm.

Until the 1960s, Roebourne was a non-indigenous town operating as a regional administrative centre, with strict controls and curfews placed on movement of Aboriginal people to, from and within the town. Most Aboriginal people were confined to camps and reserves a few kilometres away. However, as mining companies seeking to exploit the iron ore in the region constructed other company towns such as Dampier and Wickham for their workers, and as pastoralism declined, and with changing attitudes to Aboriginal welfare at governmental level in the late 1960s, Roebourne became a majority Aboriginal town as people moved out of the crowded camps and reserves, and from the outlying stations.

In later years, Roebourne became notorious for the struggles between Aboriginal people and police that were documented in a federal report dealing with Aboriginal deaths in custody, which were documented as a major issue in Aboriginal affairs from the 1980s onwards. The report showed that Roebourne (with a largely Aboriginal population of 1,200) had ratios of police to citizens that were five times that of towns in more settled parts of Western Australia.

Present day
Currently Roebourne serves the passing highway traffic and tourism, especially as the gateway to many national parks in the interior. The town's education needs are met by the Roebourne School (1905), a K-12 school serving about 250 Aboriginal students. Roebourne also contains a TAFE campus, library and telecentre, as well as a small hospital. Many other services are provided from Karratha, 40 km away.

The area is home to the Ngarluma people, but many Yindjibarndi and Banyjima people previously from outlying stations also live in the town.

The Ganalili Centre is an Aboriginal-owned cultural space. It is a reclamation of the Victoria Hotel, infamous for a 1983 incident where police officers assaulted and killed John Pat, a sixteen-year-old Yindjibarndi boy.

Ngarluma Yindjibarndi Foundation Ltd 
The Ngarluma Yindjibarndi Foundation Ltd (NYFL), which is the traditional owner representative organisation for the area on which the Woodside-operated North West Shelf project operates, is headquartered in Roebourne. In 2022, the National Indigenous Times reported that NYFL, alongside elders and community leaders, have been transforming the town of Roebourne and returning a sense of pride. NYFL programs include Ieramagadu Store Maya (also known as Foundation Food), located at the Old Roebourne General Store, a social enterprise café where local Aboriginal people undertake training and employment upskilling, and the NYFL Employment and Training program (which includes Warrgamugardi Yirdiyabura), aimed at  increasing vocational employment for local people. In September 2022, the Pilbara News reported that community-led facilities and support, such as those led by the NYFL have been key to Roebourne’s changing identity. The chief executive officer of NYFL is Sean-Paul Stephens, the chairman is Michael Woodley and deputy chair is Josephine Samson.

In 2022, NYFL achieved record employment and training results for Roebourne community through the NYFL Employment and Training program, which includes the Warrgamugardi Yirdiyabura Program. According to the National Indigenous Times, the Roebourne-based NYFL program is recognised as the most successful Aboriginal-run employment program in the West Pilbara, running a unique model supporting Aboriginal people who live in, or have a strong connection to, Roebourne.

Since 2021, NYFL has operated a not-for-profit "social supermarket" at the Old Roebourne General Store located on the North West Coastal Highway, also known as Roe Street, in Roebourne-town. The store is known as the Ieramugadu Store, and is also known as Foundation Food. NYFL board member Kevin Guiness said the Ieramagadu Store had brought a new lease of life to Roebourne's town centre.“Quite a few people in Roebourne, especially our Elders, don’t have a car or a license so travelling to Karratha or Wickham to access basic food items was a major barrier for many in our community. We needed to address this issue for the health and well being of our community. Foundation Food not only provides important access to basic food items, it also provides these at low cost, challenging the notion that food stress and food insecurity can only be addressed through food relief." The store is open to anyone, including local community members and tourists. The store serves Roebourne and outlying communities of Cheeditha, Ngurrawaana, Mingullatharndo and Weymul.

Environment and climate

The Harding River runs through the town of Roebourne. The river runs to the Indian Ocean at the tourism site of Cossack. The Cossack townsite is managed by the NYFL. The Harding River flowed to a much greater extent prior to the construction of the Harding Dam. Today, the river is a series of waterholes, including at the Roebourne townsite. 

See also
 Electoral district of Roebourne (1890–1950)
 List of extreme temperatures in Australia

Notes

Further reading
 (254 pages) 
  (134 pages)
  (179 pages)

External links

 Shire of Karratha
 Juluwarlu Group Aboriginal Corporation
 Yindjibarndi Aboriginal Corporation

Mining towns in Western Australia
Towns in Western Australia
City of Karratha